Wabash Township is one of twelve townships in Adams County, Indiana. As of the 2010 census, its population was 6,223.

Geography

Cities, towns, villages
 Berne (south half)
 Geneva

Unincorporated towns
 Ceylon

Adjacent townships
 Monroe Township (north)
 Blue Creek Township (northeast)
 Jefferson Township (east)
 Bearcreek Township, Jay County (south)
 Jackson Township, Jay County (southwest)
 Hartford Township (west)
 French Township (northwest)

Cemeteries
The township contains these cemeteries: Bunker Hill Amish, Bunker Hill (Baker Family), Collins (Ceylon), Crawford (also known as Rawley or Prairie Burying), Cross/Kross Reformed (Hoffstetter), MRE (Mennonite Reformed Evangelical), Nussbaum Family (no longer exists), Riverside, Snow, Studebaker, and Westlawn (Pyle).

Major highways

Rivers
 Wabash River

Lakes
 Rainbow Lake

Landmarks
 Lehman Park

School districts
 South Adams Schools

Political districts
 Indiana's 6th congressional district
 State House District 79
 State Senate District 19

References
 
 United States Census Bureau 2007 TIGER/Line Shapefiles
 United States National Atlas

External links
 Indiana Township Association
 United Township Association of Indiana

Townships in Adams County, Indiana
Townships in Indiana